Carbon Hill is the name of three places in the United States:
Carbon Hill, Alabama
Carbon Hill, Illinois
Carbon Hill, Ohio